WKOR (980 AM) was a radio station licensed to Starkville, Mississippi, United States. The station was owned by Cumulus Media.

The station's broadcast license was surrendered to the Federal Communications Commission for cancellation by trustee Volt Radio, LLC on January 14, 2013.

References

External links

KOR
Radio stations disestablished in 2013
Defunct radio stations in the United States
2013 disestablishments in Mississippi
KOR
KOR